Robert Krauß (20 March 1894 – 20 February 1953) was a German staff officer during World War II. He was the air-base-commandant of Halberstadt from 1935 to 1936 and Kolberg from 1938 to 1939.

Career
Robert Krauß was born on 20 March 1894 in Bayreuth, Bavaria, in the Kingdom of Bavaria.

As World War I broke out, Krauß entered the Army as a war volunteer with the Replacement Battalion of the 1st Bavarian Field-Artillery-Regiment (16 August 1914 – 20 October 1914).

By the time World War II began, he was an Oberstleutnant (Lieutenant Colonel). Krauß went on to serve as a Generalmajor in the Luftwaffe during World War II. He was an officer with special duties of the RLM and C-in-C Luftwaffe (1 November 1939 – 28 February 1940) and group-leader in the Regulations-Department, RLM (1 March 1940 – 30 September 1940). From 1 October 1940 to 30 April 1941, he was the commander of the Greater Bomber Flying School 3 in Warsaw and air-base-commandant Warsaw.

He was released from captivity in June 1947 and died in Lindau, Germany on 20 February 1953.

Bibliography
 John Weal: He 111 Kampfgeschwader in the West (Combat Aircraft). Osprey Publishing, 2012, p. 89, .

References

1894 births
1953 deaths
People from Bayreuth
People from the Kingdom of Bavaria
Luftstreitkräfte personnel
Military personnel of Bavaria
Luftwaffe World War II generals
Major generals of the Luftwaffe